Morenão, also known as Estádio Universitário Pedro Pedrossian, is the home ground of Operário and Esporte Clube Comercial. It is located at Cidade Universitária ("University City", in English), in Campo Grande, Mato Grosso do Sul, Brazil.

Information and history

The stadium is owned by Universidade Federal do Mato Grosso do Sul ("Mato Grosso do Sul Federal University", in English), also known as UFMS.

Morenão was inaugurated on March 7, 1971. The first stadium match was Flamengo against Corinthians, won by the former by 3–1. The first goal of the stadium was scored by Buião, of Flamengo.

The stadium has a capacity of 45,000 people.

Trivia

The stadium is nicknamed Morenão in reference to Campo Grande city, which is known as Cidade Morena ("Brown City", in English) because of the reddish color of its soil.
The biggest stadium attendance was 38,122 people, set on February 23, 1978, when Operário beat Palmeiras 2–0.

Brazil national football team

References

Enciclopédia do Futebol Brasileiro, Volume 2 - Lance, Rio de Janeiro: Aretê Editorial S/A, 2001.

External links
Morenão at Templos do Futebol

Football venues in Mato Grosso do Sul
Sports venues in Mato Grosso do Sul
Campo Grande